Regine Tolentino (born Regine Tolentino Maristela; September 8, 1978) is a Filipino corporate and TV host, actress, dancer, fashion designer, social media influencer, model and businesswoman.

Career
Tolentino was among the first batch of talents launched by ABS-CBN's Talent Center, now Star Magic, during its first year in December 1995.

In 1997, Tolentino became the first Filipino VJ of MTV Asia.

Regine has been very active on television and movies for more than 2 decades as an actress, TV host, celebrity judge and professional dancer, she was even dubbed as the Dance Diva.

Tolentino also works as a social media influencer, designer, inspirational speaker and licensed  dance fitness instructor travelling the world for events and appearances.

Personal life
Tolentino was married to actor Lander Vera Perez. The couple met on the set of ABS-CBN's teen drama anthology Flames. They secretly wed in a civil wedding on June 18, 1997 and remarried four months later in a church wedding. Tolentino and Vera Perez separated in 2001 but eventually got back together. They separated again in 2015. In 2016, Tolentino confirmed that she and Vera Perez have parted ways and ended their eighteen years of marriage  Tolentino and Vera Perez together have two children, Azucena Reigne and Alyssandra Reigen.

Filmography

Television

Film

Awards and nominations

References

1978 births
Living people
Filipino film actresses
Filipino television actresses
ABS-CBN personalities
GMA Network personalities
GMA Integrated News and Public Affairs people
Viva Artists Agency
VJs (media personalities)
Filipino game show hosts
Filipino female dancers
Filipino television presenters